Lethe vindhya, the black forester, is a species of Satyrinae butterfly found in India and Indochina.

References

vindhaya
Butterflies of Asia
Butterflies of Indochina
Butterflies described in 1859